Joseph Charles Jerwa (22 January 1907 – 11 April 1983) was a Polish-born Canadian professional ice hockey defenseman who played 8 seasons in the National Hockey League for the New York Rangers, Boston Bruins and New York Americans between 1930 and 1939. He was the first Polish-born player in NHL history.

Early life
Jerwa was born in Warsaw, Russian Empire (now Poland) on 22 January 1907 to Frank and Anna Jerwa. He had three brothers, Frank, Art, and Steve, all of whom later played hockey, and a sister, Josephine. The family moved to Bankhead, Alberta in 1911, then to nearby Canmore in 1922. He and his brother Frank played for both the Canmore Miners junior and senior teams during the late 1920s.

Career
Jerwa's hockey career started during the 1928-29 season with the Vancouver Lions in the PCHL. He played 77 games with them between 1928 and 1930 before being traded to the New York Rangers (NYR) along with Red Beattie for $25,000. He played 9 games for the Rangers' Can-Am affiliate, the Springfield Indians, before being recalled in December 1930. His NHL debut was on March 17, 1931 with NYR against the Ottawa Senators, wherein he earned 1 assist with a pass to Butch Keeling during the second period. He played 37 games for NYR during the 1930-31 season.

In 1931, he was traded from NYR to the Boston Bruins in exchange for Dutch Gainor. The following year, the Bruins traded Red Beattie for Jerwa's brother Frank. Between 1931 and 1935, he played 172 games for the Boston Cubs. In 1935, after 39 games with the Bruins, he was traded along with Nels Stewart to the New York Americans (NYA). Though he briefly returned to the Bruins in 1936 due to an incomplete contract, he was sent back to the NYA on loan for Al Shields and future considerations for Terry Reardon and Tom Cooper in 1937. He played 175 games with the NYA until being traded to the Cleveland Barons in 1939, where he played 147 games. He retired in 1942 after being advised by doctors to quit playing due to irreparable tears in his groin muscles. Just weeks before his retirement was announced, he was selected to play in the second-ever AHL All-Star Game on the western team.

Later life
Following his retirement from hockey, Jerwa settled in Vancover and worked as a longshoreman. In 1932, during his time with the Cubs, he married Ethel Melria "Millie" Haynes in Montréal and the couple had two children. Jerwa died on April 11, 1983, aged 75, in Coquitlam, British Columbia. He was survived by his wife, children Jerry and Joan, and 5 grandchildren. Millie died in 1993.

Career statistics

Regular season and playoffs

References

External links
 

1907 births
1983 deaths
Boston Bruins players
Boston Cubs players
Canadian ice hockey defencemen
Cleveland Barons (1937–1973) players
Ice hockey people from Alberta
Emigrants from the Russian Empire to Canada
New York Americans players
New York Rangers players
People from Canmore, Alberta
People from Warsaw Governorate
Polish ice hockey players
Polish ice hockey defencemen
Sportspeople from Warsaw
Vancouver Lions players